Hisham Fouad Greiss is a retired male track and field athlete from Egypt who competed in the hammer throw. He is one of only a few Egyptian athletes to have won gold medals at the African athletic events. Along with his colleagues Nagui Asaad, Hassan Ahmed Hamad and Mohamed Naguib Hamed, Greiss formed one of the strongest Egyptian teams in throw events.

He was twice a winner at the African Championships in Athletics (1979, 1982) and was twice gold medallist at the East and Central African Championships in Athletics (1981, 1982).

Greiss did not compete in the 1976 or 1980 Summer Olympic Games due to boycotts surrounding the games.

International competitions

See also
List of African Championships in Athletics champions
List of Egyptians

References

Year of birth missing (living people)
Living people
Egyptian male hammer throwers
20th-century Egyptian people